"It's a Short Walk from Heaven to Hell" is a song written by Ken Bell, Terry Skinner and J. L. Wallace, and recorded by actor and American country music artist John Schneider.  It was released in April 1985 as the first single from the album Tryin' to Outrun the Wind.  The song reached number 10 on the Billboard Hot Country Singles & Tracks chart.

Chart performance

References

1985 singles
1985 songs
John Schneider (screen actor) songs
Song recordings produced by Jimmy Bowen
MCA Records singles
Songs written by Terry Skinner
Songs written by J. L. Wallace
Songs written by Ken Bell (songwriter)